The women's 50 metre backstroke S2 event at the 2016 Paralympic Games took place on 15 September 2016, at the Olympic Aquatics Stadium.

Final 
19:52 15 September 2016:

Notes

Swimming at the 2016 Summer Paralympics